Stefan Stepanov (born September 23, 1992) is a Russian professional ice hockey defenceman. He became an unrestricted free agent after playing with Atlant Moscow Oblast of the Kontinental Hockey League (KHL). Stepanov was a first round selection in the 2009 KHL Junior Draft.

Stepanov made his Kontinental Hockey League (KHL) debut playing with HC CSKA Moscow during the 2010–11 KHL season.

References

External links

1992 births
Living people
Russian ice hockey defencemen
Albany Devils players
Atlant Moscow Oblast players
Avtomobilist Yekaterinburg players
HC CSKA Moscow players
Sudbury Wolves players
Sportspeople from Yekaterinburg